Ohri may refer to:

People
 Armin Öhri (born 1978), Liechtensteiner writer who was among the winners of the 2014 European Union Prize for Literature
 Deepak Ohri (born 1968), award-winning Indian entrepreneur, business leader, public speaker, guest lecturer, and mentor
 Hamdi Ohri (1872–1938), Albanian politician
 Vivek Ohri, Punjabi film producer
 Zyhdi Ohri, Albanian politician

Places
 Ohri, Albanian name of Ohrid, city in the North Macedonia
 Ohři, instrumental case of the river Ohře, found in many Czech toponyms
 Sanjak of Ohri, Ottoman Empire